Hit 96.7 is a radio station in Dubai, United Arab Emirates.  The radio station, which is a part of the Arab Media Group, broadcasts in Malayalam.  It was launched in June 2004. The jingle for the station is composed by Deepak Dev.

Presenters 
 Nyla Usha
 Arfaz Iqbal
 Jean Markose
 Maya Kartha
 Nimmy 
 Mithun Ramesh
 Dona Rijin

Shows & Schedule

References

External links 
 Hit 96.7
 Arabian Radio Network
 Hit FM Live

Radio stations established in 2004
Radio stations in the United Arab Emirates
Malayalam-language radio stations
Mass media in Dubai